Live for the Moment or Living for the Moment may refer to:

Live for the Moment, 2004 film with Noel Fitzpatrick

Music
Live for the Moment, album or the title song, by The Sherlocks, 2017
"Live for the Moment", song by Loudness from Racing
Living for the Moment  2000 album by Michael McCarthy (singer)
"Living for the Moment", song by Steven Curtis Chapman from More to This Life
"Living for the Moment", song by N-Dubz from Love.Live.Life

See also
Live in the Moment (disambiguation) 
Living in the Moment (disambiguation)